Kevin Mark Buzzard (born 21 September 1968) is a British mathematician and currently a professor of pure mathematics at Imperial College London. He specialises in arithmetic geometry and the Langlands program.

Biography
While attending the Royal Grammar School, High Wycombe he competed in the International Mathematical Olympiad, where he won a bronze medal in 1986 and a gold medal with a perfect score in 1987.

He obtained a B.A. degree (Parts I & II) in Mathematics at Trinity College, Cambridge, where he was Senior Wrangler (achiever of the highest mark), and went on to complete the C.A.S.M. He then completed his dissertation, entitled The levels of modular representations, under the supervision of Richard Taylor, for which he was awarded a Ph.D. degree.

He took a lectureship at Imperial College London in 1998, a readership in 2002, and was appointed to a professorship in 2004. From October to December 2002 he held a visiting professorship at Harvard University, having previously worked at the Institute for Advanced Study, Princeton (1995), the University of California Berkeley (1996-7), and the Institute Henri Poincaré in Paris (2000).

He was awarded a Whitehead Prize by the London Mathematical Society in 2002 for "his distinguished work in number theory", and the Senior Berwick Prize in 2008.

In 2017, he launched an ongoing formalization project and blog involving the Lean theorem prover and has since promoted the use of computer proof assistants in future mathematics research. He gave a plenary lecture at the International Congress of Mathematicians in 2022 on the topic.

He was the PhD supervisor to musician Dan Snaith, also known as Caribou, who received a PhD in mathematics from Imperial College London for his work on Overconvergent Siegel Modular Symbols.

References

External links 
 Kevin Buzzard's professional webpage
 Kevin Buzzard's personal webpage
 Kevin Buzzard's blog (Xena Project)
 

1968 births
20th-century British mathematicians
21st-century British mathematicians
Institute for Advanced Study visiting scholars
Living people
Number theorists
Harvard University staff
Alumni of Trinity College, Cambridge
Academics of Imperial College London
People educated at the Royal Grammar School, High Wycombe
Whitehead Prize winners
International Mathematical Olympiad participants